Phuguri Tea Estate  is a tea garden in the Mirik CD block in the Mirik subdivision of the Darjeeling district in the Indian state of West Bengal.

History
Dr. Camphbell was posted as a civil surgeon at Darjeeling in 1839. At that time there were hardly 20 families living in the entire hill tracts. In 1841, Dr. Camphbell brought China tea seeds from Kumaon Hills and planted them in his garden. The success of the initial efforts led the government to go for commercial development of tea gardens. Tea estates, with seeds from government nurseries, were developed at Tukvar, Steinthal and Aloobari. These were followed by other gardens.

Dr. Campbell's primary problem was to draw settlers to that uninhabited region. He sought the help of a nobleman from Nepal, Dakman Rai, to bring workers and immigrants from Nepal. Dakman Rai went back to Nepal and brought back one thousand immigrants, all of whom belonged to the Gurkha or Nepalese community. In appreciation of his helpful service, Dakman Rai was given the grant of free-hold lands presently known as Soureni Tea Estate, Samripani and Phuguri Tea Estate. The last named tea estate was set up in 1880.

Phuguri Tea Estate is presently owned by the Bagaria Group.

Geography

Phuguri Tea Estate is 7 km from Mirik.

Phuguri Tea Estate produces one of the finest clonal teas that has gained fame all over the world.

Note: The map alongside presents some of the notable locations in the subdivision. All places marked in the map are linked in the larger full screen map.

Economy
Phuguri Tea Estate produces 150,000 kg organic Darjeeling tea annually. It is certified as bio-organic and rain forest alliance, UTZ, ETP, COR, JAS, Hazard Analysis & Critical Control Point (HACCP), and Fair Trade certified.

Phuguri Tea Estate produces very fine clonal teas. Clonal tea bushes are grown from hybrid clones, rather than seeds. This enables control over the quality of tea produced.

The Bagaria Group is headed by Sheo Shankar Bagaria, assisted by Abhishek Bagaria and Asish Bagaria. In the Darjeeling hills, it also has tea gardens at Gayabaree & Millikthong and Orange Valley. One of the group companies Kusum International is tea trading and export set-up. It exports tea to Japan, Singapore, Sri Lanka, Dubai, European countries, USA and Canada.

References

External links
 

Tea estates in Darjeeling district